Juan de Celaya (Valencia, c.1490 – 6 December 1558) was a Spanish mathematician, physicist, cosmologist, philosopher and theologian. He was a member of the so-called Calculators, using ideas from Merton College. He is known for his work on motion (in kinetics and dynamics) and in logic.

Life
The son of a minor gentleman who participated in the Reconquest of Granada, he probably studied at the University of Valencia, ending his studies in 1509 at the Collège de Montaigu , Paris. During his studies he was a student of the Nominalist Jean Gaspar Lax and of Dullaert of Ghent, who exerted considerable influence on the ideas and works Celaya would write.

From 1515 to 1524 he taught at the Collège Sainte-Barbe. Among his students were Francisco de Vitoria, Francisco de Soto (who later changed his name to Domingo de Soto) and Juan Ribeyro.

He continued his theological studies, graduating on March 24, 1522 and achieving his doctorate on 21 June 1522. In 1524 he returned to his native city, and a year later became Principal and Professor of Theology at the University of Valencia, where he played an important role in the reforming the structure of studies.

Works
During his time in France, Celaya was a prolific writer, dealing mainly with the physics of Aristotle, in particular the study of motion. He also published numerous works on philosophy and logic. He was one of the main promoters of nominalist logic and the Oxford Calculators ideas about Dynamics and Kinematics.

Some of his most important works are:
 Expositio in primum tractatum Summularum magistri Petri Hispani, (1515).
 Expositio in octo libros phisicorum Aristotelis, (1517).
 Libros Physicorum Aristotelis cum quaestionibus eiusdem, secundum, triplicem viam Thomae, Realium et nominalium. This is a reprint in one volume of four previous works, published between 1525 and 1531.
 In libros Aristotelis de generationes et corruptiones.

Sources
 Complete Dictionary of Scientific Biography, William A. Wallace (2008)
 Wallace, W. A. Prelude to Galileo. Essays on Medieval and Sixteenth-Century Sources of Galileo's Thought, Dordrecht: Springer, 1981 
 Brotóns, V. N. (2000) Matemáticas y astronomía. Historia de la Universidad de Valencia: El estudio general.  
 Amparo Felipo Orts  (1993) La Universidad de Valencia durante el siglo XVI (1499-1611)
 Scholasticon (Database on Medieval Scholars - in French)
 La Universidad de Paris durante los Estudios de Francisco de Vitoria O.P. (1507-1522), by Ricardo G. Villoslada S.I., Gregorian University, 1938

1490 births
1558 deaths
Medieval European mathematics
Catholic philosophers
16th-century Spanish Roman Catholic theologians
Scholastic philosophers
16th-century Spanish mathematicians
16th-century Spanish philosophers